The Fort ships were a class of cargo ships built in Canada during World War II.

Fort ship may also refer to: 

 Breastwork monitor
 Coastal battleship
 Floating battery
 Forecastle and aftcastle
 Fort Rosalie-class replenishment ship
 Fort Victoria-class replenishment oiler

See also
 Fortress Ship (story), a 1963 short story by Fred Saberhagen from the Berserker (novel series)
 Fort (disambiguation)